Collix muscosata is a moth in the family Geometridae. It was described by David Stephen Fletcher in 1956 and it is found in Uganda.

References

Moths described in 1956
muscosata